Exeter Township is the name of some places in the U.S. state of Pennsylvania:
Exeter Township, Berks County, Pennsylvania
Exeter Township, Luzerne County, Pennsylvania
Exeter Township, Wyoming County, Pennsylvania

See also 
 Exeter Township (disambiguation)

Pennsylvania township disambiguation pages